The Asociación Costarricense de la Industria Fonográfica y Afines (FONOTICA) (English: Costa Rican Association of the Phonographic and Related Industry) is a non-profit organization and industry trade group integrated by multinational and national record companies in Costa Rica composed of various Costa Rican corporations involved in the music industry. It serves as the affiliate member of the International Federation of the Phonographic Industry (IFPI) in the country and also serves as the national ISRC agency.

History
The organization was established on June 7, 2004. It is responsible for making sure music is protected by national laws and international copyright and related rights treaties. It adds an added value to the service chain of companies that use music to attract customers, stimulate productivity or offer entertainment and culture to the general public. It also contributes to the growth of the economy, of the Gross Domestic Product (GDP) and of tax collection.

Music charts
FONOTICA publishes a weekly chart for the top 20 streamed songs in both Costa Rica and all of Central America. The charts are is based on the information compiled and sent by the BMAT company which receives the streaming reports from the participation digital platform.

The charts are updated weekly on their website and previous charts are found archived online.

See also
Monitor Latino

References

External links 
 

Organizations established in 2004
Music organizations based in Costa Rica
Music industry associations
2004 establishments in Costa Rica